Sheung Yiu Folk Museum is housed in Sheung Yiu Village, a declared monument of Hong Kong, on Pak Tam Chung Nature Trail, Sai Kung District, Hong Kong. Sheung Yiu means "above the kiln" in Chinese.

History
Sheung Yiu Village (Hong Kong Hakka pronunciation) is a Hakka village situated inside the Sai Kung Country Park. It was built by a Hakka family with the surname of Wong in the late 19th century, approximately 150 years ago. The village became prosperous due to its lime kiln whose produce was much sought-after for use in mortar and fertilizer, as well as lime bricks and tiles for building houses.

It began to decline in prosperity when modern bricks and cement came into use. In the 1950s, the villagers' men moved away to the urban areas or went overseas to earn a living, leaving some of the aged and children to reside in this property. Eventually the whole village was totally abandoned in September 1968.

After the full restoration of the village in 1983, the village was opened as Sheung Yiu Folk Museum in 1984.

Pak Tam Chung was described as consisting of six villages in 1911 with fewer than 405 inhabitants: Wong Yi Chau, Pak Tam, Sheung Yiu, Tsak Yue Wu, Wong Keng Tei and Tsam Chuk Wan. The six villages were all inhabited by Hakka people, with the exception of two hamlets in Pak Tam.

Administration
Pak Tam Chung (Sheung Yiu) is a recognized village under the New Territories Small House Policy.

Museum
The row of the eight houses constructed on a raised platform with a watch tower at its entrance are preserved and opened to the public. In its 9 galleries, the museum displays various farming implements, village period furniture and other daily objects used by the Hakka people so that the atmosphere and environment of a small Hakka village is recreated.

The lime kiln, where coral and shells were baked to form lime, had been restored for public viewing.

The museum is open from 9am-4pm, from Wednesday to Sunday each week. Entrance to the museum is free. The restored building contains a number of typical Hakka utensils and farming tools, and also some displays on the history of the inhabitants.

References

External links

 Official home page
 Antiquities and Monuments Office
 The Film Services Office

Museums established in 1984
History museums in Hong Kong
Declared monuments of Hong Kong
Sai Kung Peninsula
Folk museums in China
Rural history museums in Asia
Hakka culture in Hong Kong
1984 establishments in Hong Kong
Villages in Sai Kung District, Hong Kong